Eduardo Schroder Brock (born 6 May 1991) is a Brazilian professional footballer who plays as a defender for Paraguayan Primera División club Cerro Porteño.

Career
On 27 November 2017, Brock joined Campeonato Brasileiro Série B side Goiás from Paraná on a two-year deal.

References

External links
 
 

1991 births
Living people
Sportspeople from Rio Grande do Sul
Brazilian footballers
Association football defenders
Campeonato Brasileiro Série A players
Campeonato Brasileiro Série B players
Campeonato Brasileiro Série C players
Campeonato Brasileiro Série D players
Canoas Sport Club players
Esporte Clube Novo Hamburgo players
Esporte Clube Juventude players
Clube Esportivo Aimoré players
Grêmio Esportivo Brasil players
Paraná Clube players
Goiás Esporte Clube players
Ceará Sporting Club players
Cruzeiro Esporte Clube players